The 2018-2019 Botola 2 is the 57th season of Botola 2, the second division of the Moroccan football league.

Teams

Teams relegated from 2017-18 Botola
 Chabab Atlas Khénifra
 Racing de Casablanca

Teams promoted from 2017-18 Amateur National Championship
 Chabab Riadi Salmi
 Renaissance Ezzmamra

2018-19 clubs 
Chabab Atlas Khénifra
Racing Casablanca
Raja Beni Mellal
Chabab Ben Guerir
Olympique Dcheira
Wydad de Fès
Maghreb de Fès
Jeunesse Massira
Union Sidi Kacem
Association Salé
Kénitra AC
Ittihad Khemisset
Wydad Témara
JS de Kasbah Tadla
Chabab Riadi Salmi
Renaissance Ezzmamra

Location

Table 

Botola seasons